Eschborn is a town in the Main-Taunus district, Hesse, Germany. It is part of the Frankfurt Rhein-Main urban area and has a population of 21,488 (2018). Eschborn is home to numerous corporations due to its proximity to Frankfurt and relatively low business tax rate.

Geography

Location
Most of "old" Eschborn is on the streets Hauptstraße, near the Eschborn S-Bahn station, and Unterortstraße, including the Rathaus (Town Hall) and some old churches.
The village of Niederhöchstadt is part of Eschborn, but with a different phone area code (same as the adjacent community of Kronberg). Between Eschborn and the communities to the north and west are particularly green stretches with some pretty houses, nice walks in the foothills of the Taunus mountains.

Landscape 
Eschborn provides expansive views of the Taunus mountain ranges, especially the 'Altkönig' and behind it the 'Feldberg' up to elevations of around 880 m above sealevel. From Eschborn to the north there are numerous hiking and biking trails leading up to these green mountain zones. In winter, along and up those hills you will even find cross country skiing slopes as well as downhill sled runs used by large crowds of people, esp. on weekends.

History

Eschborn was first mentioned at the beginning of the reign of Charlemagne as king of the Franks. The reason for this first written mention of Eschborn, spelled ‘Aschenbrunne’, was a deed of donation (in the name of the martyr ) to the Benedictine Lorsch Abbey, which is about 60 km south of Eschborn.

The name Aschenbrunne means "well at the ash tree".

Buildings and architecture 

Large areas of the town are still undeveloped and green expanses fuse in with several high-rises, with a brook passing by the Rathaus (Town Hall) and running close to the S-Bahn railway line, that joins the river Nidda (which in turn is a tributary of the River Main that flows through Frankfurt am Main). Housing large corporations that have chosen Eschborn, the high-rises of Deutsche Bank, LG (formerly occupied by Vodafone (formerly Arcor)), Deutsche Telekom (T-Systems), Ernst & Young, Deutsche Börse Group (building named "The Cube") and newly SAP, are unmissable.

The street housing the Deutsche Bank offices is named Alfred-Herrhausen-Allee, after Alfred Herrhausen, former Chairman of Deutsche Bank who was killed on 30. November 1989 by the RAF (Red Army Faction, the Baader-Meinhof Group) assailants near his home in Bad Homburg.

Town partnerships
Eschborn is twinned with 4 towns in Europe:
 Montgeron, France since 1985
 Póvoa de Varzim, Portugal since 2010
 Żabbar, Malta since 2010
 Viernau, Germany

Public transport

The S-Bahn train station Eschborn Süd (south) happens to be the last stop on the route still falling under the Zone 50 which covers Frankfurt (excluding suburbs), and hence means a lot to employees who can commute using the same monthly pass. Two S-Bahn lines (S 3 and S4) operate to Eschborn. They both connect to Frankfurt Central Station and end in Darmstadt main station (S3) or Langen station (S4).

Education
Eschborn has 4 schools in total:
 Hartmutschule (Elementary)
 Süd-West-Schule (Elementary)
 Westerbach-Schule (Elementary), in Niederhöchstadt
 Heinrich-von-Kleist-Schule (High School)

Economy and business
Following Government offices are located in Eschborn:
 Bundesamt für Wirtschaft und Ausfuhrkontrolle (BAFA) - The Federal Office of Economics and Export Control 
 Bundesnetzagentur (vormals RegTP; Außenstelle Hessen) - (The Federal Network Agency)
 Bundesrechnungshof - (Branch of the federal financial management)
 Deutsche Gesellschaft für Internationale Zusammenarbeit (GIZ) -  English
Many common companies have headquarters or branches located in Eschborn. Other Companies with branches in Eschborn are: Deutsche Bank AG, Siemens SE, Deutsche Telekom AG, Ernst & Young, Continental AG, and Vodafone Germany.

Nissin Foods GmbH has its offices in Eschborn.

Sport
The FC Eschborn football team was established in 1930.
The chess club SC Eschborn 1974 was founded in 1974.

Points of interest
 Arboretum Main-Taunus

Notable people

 Heinrich von Kleist (1777–1811), was quartered on 25 February 1795 as a young lieutenant in Eschborn. He wrote two letters to his sister
 Karl-Heinz Koch (1924–2007), former Hessian minister of justice (CDU), father of Roland Koch
 Roland Koch (born 1958), politician, former Hessian Prime Minister (CDU), grew up in Eschborn and still lives there today

References

External links

 Official website of the town of Eschborn
 Historische Gesellschaft Eschborn e. V.
 Public transportation operator
 
 

Towns in Hesse
Main-Taunus-Kreis